Raymond Francis Fitzgerald (December 5, 1904 in Chicopee, Massachusetts – September 6, 1977 in Westfield, Massachusetts) was a professional baseball player. An outfielder who batted from the right side and threw with his right hand, Fitzgerald had a listed height of 5'9" and a listed weight of 168 pounds.

Fitzgerald played in only one game in the major leagues, appearing as a pinch hitter for the Cincinnati Reds on April 18, 1931 in a 9-6 loss to the Pittsburgh Pirates. He was active for several years in the minor leagues, however, with clubs such as the Toronto Maple Leafs.

External links

1904 births
1977 deaths
Cincinnati Reds players
Baseball players from Massachusetts
People from Chicopee, Massachusetts
Sandusky Sailors players